Desna (Russian: Десна) was one of eight s built for the Russian Imperial Navy during World War I. Completed in 1916, she served with the Baltic Fleet and joined the Bolshevik Red Fleet after the October Revolution of 1918. She was active during the Russian Civil War, taking part in several engagements against British ships during the British campaign in the Baltic. The destroyer was renamed Engels (Russian: Энгельс) in 1922. She remained in service with the Soviet Baltic Fleet when Germany invaded the Soviet Union in 1941 (Operation Barbarossa), and was sunk on 24 August.

Bibliography 

 

 

 

Orfey-class destroyers
Destroyers of the Imperial Russian Navy
Ships built in Russia
1914 ships
World War I destroyers of Russia
Destroyers of the Soviet Navy